Çakırçay (also Gerence) is a village in Hanönü District, in Kastamonu Province, Turkey. Its population is 96 (2021).

References 

Villages in Hanönü District